Sanjay Jain is a lecturer at the University of Oxford with research interest in development economics. He was an assistant professor of economics at the University of Virginia from 2001 to 2009. Before he was an assistant professor of economics and international affairs at the George Washington University from 1994 to 2001 and a lecturer in the department of economics at the Princeton University from 1993 to 1994.

Education
He obtained his PhD in economics from the Princeton University in 1995, M.A. in economics from the Johns Hopkins University in 1989 and B.A. (Honours) in Economics from St. Stephen's College, University of Delhi in 1986. He did his schooling in Modern School, Barakhamba Road, New Delhi.

Research interest
 Development Economics
 Political Economy
 Applied Microeconomic Theory

Publications
 
 
  
  
  Pdf.
 
Reprinted as:

References

Princeton University alumni
Johns Hopkins University alumni
Elliott School of International Affairs faculty
Living people
British development economists
British economists
British Jains
Year of birth missing (living people)